The 1933 Memorial Cup final was the 15th junior ice hockey championship of the Canadian Amateur Hockey Association. The George Richardson Memorial Trophy champions Newmarket Redmen of the Ontario Hockey Association in Eastern Canada competed against the Abbott Cup champions Regina Pats of the South Saskatchewan Junior Hockey League in Western Canada. In a best-of-three series, held at Maple Leaf Gardens in Toronto, Ontario, Newmarket won their 1st Memorial Cup, defeating Regina 2 games to 0.

Scores
Game 1: Newmarket 2-1 Regina
Game 2: Newmarket 2-1 Regina (3OT)

Winning roster
Silver Doran, Ran Forder, Chief Huggins, Pep Kelly, Norm Mann, Aubrey Marshall, Red McArthur,M. Ogilvie, Jimmy Parr, Howard Peterson, Gar Preston, Sparky Vail, Don Willson.  Coach: Bill Hancock

References

External links
 Memorial Cup
 Canadian Hockey League

1932–33 in Canadian ice hockey
Memorial Cup tournaments
Ice hockey competitions in Toronto
Memorial Cup
1930s in Toronto